Julian Chiagoziem Reid (born 23 September 1988 in Kingston, Jamaica) is a Jamaica-born British athlete competing in the long and triple jump. He switched his allegiance to Great Britain in 2011.

He went to Texas A&M University.

Competition record

Personal bests
Outdoor
High jump – 2.10 (Kingston 2007)
Long jump – 8.08 (+0.7 m/s) (Kingston 2011)
Triple jump – 16.98 (+1.4 m/s) (Fayetteville 2009)

Indoor
High jump – 2.00 (College Station 2009)
Long jump – 7.92 (Fayetteville 2008)
Triple jump – 16.71 (College Station 2011)

References

External links

1988 births
Living people
Sportspeople from Kingston, Jamaica
Jamaican male long jumpers
British male long jumpers
Jamaican male triple jumpers
British male triple jumpers
Jamaican male high jumpers
British male high jumpers
Universiade medalists in athletics (track and field)
Universiade bronze medalists for Great Britain
Medalists at the 2011 Summer Universiade
World Athletics Championships athletes for Great Britain
European Athletics Championships medalists
British Athletics Championships winners
Jamaican emigrants to the United Kingdom
Naturalised citizens of the United Kingdom